Ron, Ronnie or Ronald Morris may refer to:

 Ron Morris (pole vaulter) (born 1935), American pole vault 1960 Olympic silver medalist
 Ron Morris (American football) (born 1964), American National Football League wide receiver
 Ron Morris (Canadian football), Canadian Football League player (1959–1965) and coach (1967–1968)
 Ronnie Morris, musician with the Canadian indie rock band controller.controller
 Ronnie Morris (footballer) (born 1970), English former professional footballer
 Ronnie Morris (rugby union) (1913–1983), Welsh rugby union player